Caligo martia is a butterfly of the family Nymphalidae. The species can be found in Brazil.

The larvae feed on Echinochloa crus-galli and Pennisetum purpureum.

References

Caligo
Fauna of Brazil
Nymphalidae of South America
Taxa named by Jean-Baptiste Godart
Butterflies described in 1824